Kurash competition at the 2014 Asian Beach Games was held in Phuket, Thailand from 15 to 17 November 2014 at Patong Beach, Phuket.

Medalists

Men

Women

Medal table

Results

Men

66 kg
15 November

73 kg
16 November

81 kg
16 November

 Sanjar Tukhtashov of Uzbekistan originally won the gold medal, but was disqualified after he tested positive for 19-Norandrosterone.

90 kg
17 November

+90 kg
17 November

Women

52 kg
15 November

57 kg
16 November

63 kg
17 November

References

External links 
 

2014 Asian Beach Games events